YCF may refer to:

 Yacimientos Carboníferos Fiscales, known by its acronym YCF, a defunct state-owned company in Argentina
 Cortes Island Aerodrome, Canada (by IATA code)
 Young Calvinist Federation, a youth ministry in Canada and the United States
 Ycf4, Ycf9, and Ycf14, protein names standing for hypothetical chloroplast open reading frame
 YCF1, a yeast cadmium factor protein